The  is a ship operating company in Yokohama. Founded in 1963, the company operates water buses and an excursion cruise ship, both within the Port of Yokohama. The services include public lines listed below, as well as event cruises and chartered ships.

Lines
Ships always go this direction, never the opposite.
 (Water bus)
Ōsambashi — World Porters-mae — Nippon-Maru — Ōsambashi
Closes on Monday (or the next day if Monday is a holiday).
 (Excursion cruise ship)
Ōsambashi — (Port of Yokohama) — Nippon-Maru — Ōsambashi
Operated on weekends and holidays.

Stations

See also
The Port Service
Tokyo Cruise Ship
Tokyo Mizube Line
Water taxi

External links
 Official website

Ferry companies of Japan
Companies based in Yokohama